Underdark is a death metal band  from Przemysl, Poland. Their debut album  In the Name of Chaos, (released in Poland by Psycho Records in 2009) received good feedback in Polish underground and mainstream press.
Since December 2010, Underdark has been distributed worldwide under Greek label Sleaszy Rider Records.

History

The beginnings 

Underdark was formed in 2005 in Przemysl (small provincial town in Poland) by Drizzt (Adam Drys - guitar) and Spider (Kamil Rusiecki - guitar), who decided to build the band "from scratch". Later Dyvan (bass) joined the band. 
In the first year musicians began rehearsing and writing first songs. The biggest drawback of that time was a lack of drummer. In 2007, Ziemal (drums) joined the band so that Underdark could record its demo album. Although it was a DIY production it received good feedback from fans and mostly underground press in Poland.
In 2008 Ziemal left the band. Underdark began to search for a skillful drummer with a proper attitude. In April 2009, Blasturbator joined the band. Since that moment Underdark started working on brisk pace, what resulted in touring in Poland and recording a debut album "In The Name of Chaos" (September 2009)

In the Name of Chaos 

"In The Name of Chaos" was released in Poland in February 2010 (Psycho Records, CD),  and was acclaimed in both underground and mainstream press in Poland.  Soon after that Underdark signed to Greek leading metal label Sleaszy Rider Records which is going to release "In The Name of Chaos" and the forthcoming band's album internationally.
In September 2010 Underdark began to work with Przemyslaw "Przemas" Grzadziel (booking issues). In October 2010 the band shot their first video namely "World Reframed".

Current members 

 Adam Dryś (Drizzt) – guitar, backing vocals, (also: Cryptic Tales, Sacrifer)
 Marcin Pitorak (Dyvan) – lead vocals, bass guitar, (also: BlackSnake)
 Kamil Rusiecki (Spider) – guitars
 Kamil Bracichowicz (Blasturbator) – drums and percussion (also: Embrional)

Discography

Videos 
 Video clip "World Reframed" (2010)

External links 
 Official site of Underdark
 Underdark - myspace
 Official youtube channel
 Management Underdark

Polish heavy metal musical groups
Polish death metal musical groups
Musical quartets